David Selberg (16 June 1995 – 17 June 2018) was a Swedish ice hockey defenceman. He played with Luleå HF of the Swedish Hockey League (SHL).

Selberg made his Swedish Hockey League debut playing with Luleå HF during the 2013–14 SHL season.

Selberg's suicide was announced 18 June 2018.

References

External links

1995 births
2018 deaths
Luleå HF players
Piteå HC players
Swedish ice hockey defencemen